Darrehi (also Romanized as Darreh’ī; also known as Areh, Arreh, and Darreh) is a village in Dalfard Rural District, Sarduiyeh District, Jiroft County, Kerman Province, Iran. At the 2006 census, its population was 398, in 74 families.

References 

Populated places in Jiroft County